Echineulima thaanumi is a species of sea snail, a marine gastropod mollusk in the family Eulimidae.

Distribution
This marine species mainly occurs around the Hawaiian Islands.

References

External links
 To World Register of Marine Species

Eulimidae
Gastropods described in 1921